Arthur Hollins  (19 September 1876 – 22 April 1962) was an English trade unionist and Labour politician who was a Member of Parliament for Hanley in Staffordshire, England.

Hollins was born in Burslem, Staffordshire, the son of son of William and Caroline Hollins. He was educated at St. Paul's Church School and the Wedgwood Institute in Burslem, one of The Potteries that formed the city of Stoke-on-Trent. He was general-secretary of the National Society of Pottery Workers from 1928 to 1947.

He was elected as an MP at a by-election in 1928, lost his seat at the 1931 general election, won it back in 1935, and stood down in 1945. Hollins was a local councillor and was Lord Mayor of Stoke-on-Trent for 1933–34, was awarded CBE in 1949, and became a Freeman of the City of Stoke-on-Trent in 1960. He died in 1962.

References

External links
Mr Arthur Hollins at TheyWorkForYou (includes links to some of his contributions to debates)
 

Labour Party (UK) MPs for English constituencies
UK MPs 1924–1929
UK MPs 1929–1931
UK MPs 1935–1945
Ceramic and Allied Trades Union-sponsored MPs
General Secretaries of the Ceramic and Allied Trades Union
Lord Mayors of Stoke-on-Trent
1876 births
1962 deaths
Commanders of the Order of the British Empire
People from Burslem
Trade unionists from Staffordshire